(), also known as , , and , sometimes referred as dragon robe although they are different garments, in English, is a type of , a robe, in . The  was characterized by the use of a python embroidery called  although the python embroidery is not a python snake as defined in the English dictionary but a four-clawed Chinese dragon-like creature. The  was worn in the Ming and Qing dynasties. People who were bestowed with  could not exchange it with or gifted it to other people. They were worn by members of the imperial family below of crown prince, by military and civil officials, and by Official wives. They could also be bestowed by the Emperor to people who performed extraordinary services to the empire as rewards, to the members of the Grand Secretariat and to prominent Daoist patriarchs, imperial physicians, tributary countries and local chiefs whose loyalty were considered crucial to secure the borders.

embroidery design 

After the Ming dynasty, it was expressed that a  would be demoted to a  if it lost one of its claw. 

History 

According to Shen Dufu, the sumptuary laws were being trespassed and the fault was that of the Emperor who was failing at regulating the possession robes adorned with imperial insignia.  

During the 16th year of Emperor Hongzhi (1504), the customs of bestowing  to the Grand Secretariat began. 

The Jiajing emperor also bestowed  to prominent Daoist patriarchs several times during his reign.

In 1578, Great Empress Dowager Li bestowed  to Zhang Juzhen on behalf of the Emperor.

During the reign under Emperor Wanli, many  were bestowed. According to Xie Zhaozhe in the 《 – 》, more than 10,000 eunuchs were wearing  and jade belts in the Forbidden City. However, the  did not become a common form of clothing.

Qing dynasty

As  and  

The structure of the Manchu  worn in the Qing dynasty differed from those worn in the Ming dynasty as the  worn in the Qing dynasty was modified based on the early male clothing of the Manchu, thus retaining the original features while making new changes to the robes; for example, the Manchu  had horse hoof-shaped cuff.

and

Construction and design 
There is also strict regulations on the robes' colour and the numbers of  that were allowed to decorate the :

List of people who were bestowed with  
 Liu Jian (劉健) (1433–1526), Grand Secretary from 1492 to 1513, was bestowed with a red .
 Li Dongyang (1447–1516), Grand Secretary from 1494 to 1513, was bestowed with a red .
 Xie Qian (1450–1531), Grand Secretary from 1495 to 1506 and from 1527 to 1528, was bestowed with a red .

Theatrical /  

The , Chinese opera costumes, were made based on the clothing style of the Ming dynasty while also absorbing clothing features of the Song, Yuan, and Qing dynasties.

In Chinese opera, the theatrical  is the highest of formal, ceremonial robe worn by performers in the roles of emperors, princes, officials (ministers for specific occasions, such as court audience), and generals. 

The theatrical  has a male and female version; the  patterns on the robes vary and can be found in:  medallions, front-viewed  and flying dragon.

When decorated with flying dragon patterns, the robe is typically also decorated with patterns of waves and mountain peaks. There is also strict regulations on the colours used in the theatrical ; the colours are divided into "upper five colours" and "lower five colours",  (bright yellow) colour is exclusively reserved for imperial usage. Other colours included: red.

Mang in Beijing opera 

The colours used in the  also have clear symbolism: red means majestic and noble; green means mighty and bold; white represents handsome young people; black is used to represent people who are upright and unconstrained.

Subtypes of theatrical  

Depictions in entertainment media and literature 

 Chinese opera,
 Jin Ping Mei,

Similar clothing 

 Jisün
 terlig
 Yesa
 Feiyufu
 Douniufu
 Dragon robe

See also 

 Hanfu
 List of Hanfu
 Chinese ornamental gold silk

References 

Hanfu
Chinese traditional clothing
Court uniforms and dress